The vault is an artistic gymnastics apparatus which gymnasts perform on, as well as the skill performed using that apparatus. Vaulting is also the action of performing a vault. Both male and female gymnasts perform the vault. The English abbreviation for the event in gymnastics scoring is VT.

The apparatus 

Early forms of the vault were invented by German Friedrich Ludwig Jahn. The apparatus itself originated as a "horse", much like the pommel horse but without the handles; it was sometimes known as the vaulting horse. The horse was set up with its long dimension perpendicular to the run for women, and parallel for men. The vaulting horse was the apparatus used in the Olympics for over a century, beginning with the Men's vault in the first modern Olympics and ending with the Gymnastics at the 2000 Summer Olympics.

Following the accident in 1988 and compounded by the ones in 1998 and 2000, International Gymnastics Federation (FIG) re-evaluated and changed the apparatus, citing both safety reasons and the desire to facilitate more impressive acrobatics.  The 2001 World Artistic Gymnastics Championships were the first international competition to make use of the "vaulting table", an apparatus made by Dutch gymnastics equipment company Janssen-Fritsen since the mid-1990s. It features a flat, larger, and more cushioned surface almost parallel to the floor, which slopes downward at the end closest to the springboard; gymnasts nicknamed it the "tongue"; it appears to be somewhat safer than the old apparatus.

Dimensions 

Length:  ± 
Width:  ± 
Height:
Men:  ± 
Women:  ± 
Run up area:
Length:  ± 
Width:  ±

Kinematics
The running speed is correlated with the difficulty of vault performed, with a stronger correlation for women than men, who may not maximize their sprint speed to achieve even the most difficult vaults.

Training
Training for vaults can include plyometric training.

Injuries

The horse has been blamed for several serious accidents over the years. In 1988, American Julissa Gomez was paralyzed in a vaulting accident; she died from complications from her injuries three years later. During warmups at the 1998 Goodwill Games, Chinese gymnast Sang Lan fell and suffered paralysis from a cervical-spine injury. In a series of crashes when the horse's height was set too low at the 2000 Olympics, gymnasts either rammed into the horse's front end, or had bad landings after having problems with their hand placements during push-off.

In 2007, Dutch junior gymnast Imke Glas was seriously injured after a fall on a vault.

A 2021 study suggested that landing scoring criteria for vault in women's gymnastics increased the risk of injury compared to the criteria in men's gymnastics. Both this study and an earlier one from 2015 recommended allowing more flexion at the knees during landing to reduce impact-related injuries.

Routines 

To perform a vault, the gymnast runs down a runway (the run), which is usually padded or carpeted. They hurdle onto a springboard and spring onto the vault with their hands (the preflight or first flight, and block). For vaults in the Yurchenko family, the gymnast will put their hands onto a mat that is placed before the springboard, round-off onto the board, and do a back handspring onto the vault. The off-flight may be as simple as leaping over the apparatus or as complicated as executing several twists and turns in the air. The gymnast then lands on the mat on the other side of the apparatus.

Scoring and rules 
Gymnasts are expected to land cleanly, with no hops or steps, and within a set landing zone on the landing mat. They must also demonstrate good technique and execution in the actual vault. Falling or stepping on landing incurs deduction, as will lack of height off the table, or distance from the table. 

Gymnasts (both male and female) show one vault in Qualification, Team Final, and All Around Final. If the gymnast wishes to qualify for vault apparatus finals, they must perform a second vault during qualifications.  In the Apparatus Finals gymnasts must also show two vaults.  For men, the two vaults must be from different element groups, while women must show two vaults with different repulsion and flight phase from the vault table.

Judging and scoring 
Because the vault is completed so quickly it helps if there are cameras to play back in slow motion if they are unsure or if all the judges have a wide range of scores. Judges look through four main phases: the pre-flight, support, after-flight, and landing. The overall vault of a gymnast should have power and speed, while being explosive and precise as possible.

A woman's competition score is the combined average score of the two vaults she performs. Scoring has become very different in these past years. No event is scored out of ten. The new system was designed in 2005. The judges evaluate the projected difficulty of the routine and the actual skills executed to determine the final score. The projected difficulty is increased with every skill included. Each skill has its own value; the harder the skill the higher the start value. The execution is out of 10.0, looking at the form, height, length, and the landing. Then in 2009, FIG made some changes to put less emphasis on the difficulty and reduce the amount of skills required, making the gymnasts focus harder on perfect execution of the vault.

Vault families 

Vault styles are broken into various groups or families. In order to compete in a vault final, a gymnast must perform two vaults from different groups whose second flight phase is not identical.

Vault groups (men) 
There are four vault categories for men:
Single salto vaults with complex twists.
Handspring vaults with or without simple twists, and all double salto fwd.
Handspring sideways and Tsukahara vaults with or without simple twists, and all double salto bwd.
Round off entry vaults

Vault groups (women) 
There are five vault categories for women:
Vault without salto (Handspring, Yamashita, Round-off) with or without LA turn in 1st and/or 2nd flight phase.
Handspring fwd with or without 1/1 turn (360°) in 1st flight phase – salto fwd or bwd with or without twist in 2nd flight phase.
Handspring with ¼ - ½ turn (90° - 180°) in 1st flight phase (Tsukahara) – salto bwd with or without twist in 2nd flight phase.
Round-off (Yurchenko) with or without ¾ turn (270°) in 1st flight phase – salto bwd with or without twist in 2nd flight phase.
Round-off with ½ turn (180°) in 1st flight phase – salto fwd or bwd with or without twist in 2nd flight phase.

References 

Artistic gymnastics apparatus
Vault (gymnastics)